Excalibur is the mythical sword of King Arthur.

Excalibur may also refer to:

Arts, entertainment, and media

Fictional entities
 Excalibur (comics), a superhero group in Marvel Comics (see below for comics featuring the group)
 Faiza Hussain, later codenamed Excalibur, a Marvel Comics superhero
 Excalibur, a talking sword character in Soul Eater
 Excalibur, the sword used by Saber throughout most of the Fate series
 Excalibur, the sword which was broken into seven different swords in High School DxD
 Excalibur, the right arm of Capricorn Saint from Saint Seiya
 Excalibur, a sword in the video game Sonic and the Black Knight (2009)
 Excalibur, a sword in the manga The Seven Deadly Sins (Nanatsu no Taizai)
 Excalibur, an obtainable sword in the video game Tomb Raider: Legend (2006)
 Excalibur, a playable character from Warframe
 Excalibur, an obtainable sword in the video game Terraria

Literature
 Excalibur (comic book), several comic books featuring the Marvel Comics group
 Excalibur (L. Ron Hubbard), an unpublished 1938 manuscript composed by Scientology founder L. Ron Hubbard
 Excalibur (novel), a 1973 fantasy novel by Sanders Anne Laubenthal
 Excalibur: A Novel of Arthur, a 1997 novel by Bernard Cornwell in his series The Warlord Chronicles

Music
 Excalibur (Grave Digger album), 1999
 Excalibur (rock opera), a 1998 rock opera written and directed by Alan Simon
 Excalibur (Tom Fogerty album), 1972

Rollercoasters
 Excalibur (Funtown Splashtown USA), a roller coaster at Funtown Splashtown USA in Saco, Maine, United States
 Excalibur (Valleyfair), a roller coaster at Valleyfair amusement park in Shakopee, Minnesota, United States
 Excalibur, a former roller coaster at Six Flags AstroWorld

Television
 "Excalibur", a 1985 episode of the cartoon G.I. Joe: A Real American Hero
 Excalibur, a BBC Two television ident first aired in 2000 (see BBC Two '1991–2001' idents)

Video games
 Excalibur (video game), a 1983 video game 
 Excalibur: Morgana's Revenge, a 2007 first-person shooter video game
 Excalibur 2555 AD, a 1997 action-adventure video game

Other uses in arts, entertainment, and media
 Excalibur (film), a 1981 film about the legend of King Arthur
 Excalibur (newspaper), the community newspaper of York University, Toronto

Brands and enterprises
 Excalibur (nightclub), a nightclub in Chicago, Illinois, United States
 Excalibur, a brand of non-stick surface
 Excalibur Airways, a defunct UK airline
 Excalibur Hotel and Casino, a hotel and casino in Las Vegas, Nevada, United States
 Excalibur series, an electric guitar built by Vigier Guitars
 HTC Excalibur, a smartphone manufactured by High Tech Computer

Computing and technology
 Apache Excalibur, a project to produce a set of software components for the Java programming language
 DARPA's Excalibur program, an attempt to apply phased-array optics to laser weapons
 Excalibur, a prehistoric axe made of red quartzite found at the Archaeological site of Atapuerca, Spain
 Excalibur BBS, a Windows-based GUI BBS client
 Project Excalibur, an initiative to develop an orbiting nuclear-bomb-pumped X-ray laser

Places
 Excalibur (Arizona), a summit in Arizona, United States
 Excalibur Estate, a housing estate in Catford, South London, England
 Excalibur Pot, a cave/pothole in the North Yorkshire Moors, United Kingdom

Transport
 Excalibur (automobile), an American specialty car introduced in 1963 with bodywork similar to a 1928 Mercedes-Benz
 Excalibur (racing yacht), an Australian racing yacht
 Excalibur, one of three Sikorsky VS-44 flying boats
 Excalibur Aircraft Excalibur, an ultralight aircraft
 Excalibur 800, an aftermarket conversion of the Beechcraft Twin Bonanza twin-engined aircraft, originally developed by Swearingen Aircraft
 Excalibur Queen Air, a similar aftermarket conversion of the Beechcraft Queen Air twin-engined aircraft, also originally developed by Swearingen
 HMS Excalibur, a ship in the British Royal Navy
 Lockheed Model 44 Excalibur, a cancelled four-engined airliner

Weapons
 Excalibur rifle Mark-I, a modified version of the INSAS assault rifle  
 M982 Excalibur, 155mm GPS-guided extended range artillery projectile

Other uses
 British Columbia Excalibur Party, a minor political party in British Columbia, Canada
 Excalibur (wrestler), former professional wrestler and current color commentator for All Elite Wrestling
 Excalibur Primary School, a school in Alsager, United Kingdom

See also
 King Arthur (disambiguation)
 The Sword in the Stone (disambiguation)
 Xcalibur (disambiguation)